Carmelina Sánchez-Cutillas i Martínez del Romero (Madrid, 23 June 1921 – Valencia, 22 February 2009) was a Spanish historian, novelist and poet in Catalan language. Winner of the first Competition of Valencian Poetry of the University of Kentucky, a selection of her poem book Un món rebel (A rebel world) was translated into English in 1969.

References 

Writers from the Valencian Community
1921 births
2009 deaths
Writers from Madrid
20th-century Spanish historians